Boushey is a surname. Notable people with the surname include:

David L. Boushey (born 1942), American stuntman, stunt coordinator, stage fight director, and stunt trainer
Heather Boushey (born 1970), American economist

See also
Boughey